Barefoot in Athens is a 1966 Hallmark Hall of Fame television film directed by George Schaefer. It stars Peter Ustinov, Geraldine Page, Anthony Quayle, Lloyd Bochner and Christopher Walken in his film debut.

Plot
The film concerns the trial and last days of Socrates.

Cast
Peter Ustinov as Socrates
Geraldine Page as Xantippe
Anthony Quayle as King Pausanias of Sparta
Lloyd Bochner as Critias
Christopher Walken as Lamprocles
Salome Jens as Theodote
Eric Berry as Meletos
Frank Griso as Lysis

Production

Development
The film was adapted by Robert Hartung from the 1951 Maxwell Anderson play of the same name.

Reception

Awards
Ustinov won an Emmy Award for his performance in this film.

External links
 

1966 television films
1966 films
1960s English-language films
Hallmark Hall of Fame episodes
1966 drama films
Films directed by George Schaefer
Films set in Athens
Films set in the 4th century BC
Films set in ancient Greece
Films set in Greece
Cultural depictions of Socrates